The Bréguet XIV (in contemporary practice) or Bréguet 14 was a French biplane bomber and reconnaissance aircraft of World War I. It was built in very large numbers and production continued for many years after the end of the war.

The Bréguet 14 was among the first mass-produced aircraft to use large amounts of aluminium, rather than wood or steel, in its structure. This allowed the airframe to be both lighter and stronger, in turn making the aircraft fast and agile and it was able to outrun some contemporary fighters.

Development

Background
The Bréguet 14 was designed by aviation pioneer and aeronautical engineer Louis Bréguet. Bréguet had already built a reputation for producing capable aircraft and for having innovative ideas, including the use of metal in aircraft construction. The outbreak of the First World War in 1914 led to Bréguet-built aircraft being ordered by the military air services of several  Triple Entente nations. He temporarily abandoned the preferred tractor configuration for a pusher design to satisfy the French general staff, who sought a clear forward view for the observer. 

In spite of the French official preference for pushers, Bréguet remained a proponent of tractor aircraft. In June 1916, he began a new design for a military two-seater, the Bréguet AV. Bréguet determined that the Hispano-Suiza lacked sufficient power, and instead chose the Renault V-12 engine previously used in the Bréguet Type V.

Two variants of the Bréguet AV (Type XIII and Type XIV to the French authorities) were built. Both had a boxy shape that was complemented by a rectangular frontal radiator and the unusual negative or back stagger of its wings. It possessed a sturdy undercarriage, along with ailerons on the upper wing only. The lower wing featured flaps along the entire trailing edges, that were forced into their raised position by the air, as the aircraft accelerated to its normal speed, being restricted from moving freely by a set of 12 adjustable rubber bungee cords.

The airframe's structure was constructed primarily of duralumin, an aluminium alloy which had been invented in Germany by Alfred Wilm only a decade previously. Many sections, such as the duralumin longerons and spacers, were attached using welded steel-tube fittings and braced using piano wire. The wing spars were of rectangular duralumin tubes with either oak or ash shims at the attachment points and wrapped in a sheet steel sheath. The wooden box ribs had fretted plywood webs and ash flanges. The tail unit was built up from welded steel tube, while the elevators featured large horn balances. French officials were initially wary of the Type XIV's innovative materials due to a lack of experience with them.

Into flight

Louis Bréguet made took the prototype into the air for the first time on 21 November 1916. In November 1916, the S.T.Aé. had issued requirements for four new aircraft types, and Bréguet submitted the XIV for two of those - reconnaissance and bomber.

The prototype was passed to the S.T.Aé on 11 January 1917 for trials and was accepted to fill both roles. On 22 February 1917, Bréguet asked the S.T.Aé about initiating production and informed them on 2 March that jigs were ready. On 6 March 1917, the first official production order was received by Bréguet, calling for 150 Bréguet XIV A.2 reconnaissance aircraft and an additional order for 100 XIV B.2 bombers was received on 4 April.
The A.2 was equipped with several cameras, while some also had radios. The lower wing of the 14 B.2 was fitted with Michelin-built bomb racks for thirty-two  bombs. To avoid the bomb racks jamming the flaps, a forward extension of the wings was added, while transparent panels were added to the sides of the fuselage to aid in the use of the bomb sight.

By mid-1917, the French authorities ordered a substantial increase in production. Various other companies were contracted to manufacture the type. On 25 April, French aviation company Darracq was requested to manufacture 330 aircraft. On 8 June, 50 were ordered from Farman and on 18 June, Paul Schmitt was issued a contract to produce 200 aircraft. Some of the contractors were unable to commence quantity production of the Bréguet 14 until 1918. Following the war, some aircraft were constructed in French military workshops in Indo-China, although these are likely to have been reliant on imported parts.

As an insurance against engine shortages, alternatives to the standard Renault powerplant were installed, both for experimental purposes and in production quantities. Aside from some used in France, many of the Belgian and American Bréguet 14s were powered with the Fiat A.12 engine. An improved model of the standard engine, the Renault 12Ff, appeared in Summer 1918 and was used on some late production aircraft. Another engine adopted was built by French automotive company Lorraine-Dietrich, which was lighter but produced less power than the Renault unit. A number of late production B.2 models were equipped with the American Liberty engine. To distinguish these aircraft, they were designated Bréguet XIV B.2 L.

Other minor variants of the Bréguet 14 were flown in small numbers during the Great War; these included the XIV B.1 (Bombardement) long-range single-seat bomber, the XIV GR.2 (Grande Raid) long-range reconnaissance/bomber, the XIV H (Hydro) floatplane, the XIV S (Sanitaire) air ambulance and the XIV Et.2 (Ecole) trainer. Later variants, such as the XIVbis A.2 and XIVbis B.2, featured improved wings. An variant equipped with enlarged wings was produced as the XVI Bn.2 (Bombardement de nuit) night bomber. Further derivatives of the aircraft included the XVII C.2 (Chasse) two-seat fighter, which would only be built in small numbers due to the end of the war. Production of the Bréguet 14 would continue long after the end of the war, only ending in 1926.

Operational history

The Bréguet 14 was used in large numbers from May 1917 onwards, and at its peak equipped at least 71 escadrilles, and was deployed on both the Western Front, where it participated in number major actions in which it typically acquitted itself well, and in the east, on the Italian front.

For its actions during the Battle of the Lys, the Section Artillerie Lourde, equipped with the type, received a citation and was further lauded for its actions during the Allied counter-attack to the German spring offensive. On 9 July 1918, Capitaine Paul-Louise Weiller shot down two enemy aircraft during one sortie while flying the type.

Following its introduction by the French, during 1918, the Bréguet 14 was also ordered by the Belgian Army (40 aircraft) and the United States Army Air Service (over 600 aircraft). Around half the Belgian and U.S. aircraft were fitted with Fiat A.12 engines due to shortages of the original Renault 12F. Prior to the Armistice of 11 November 1918, the Bréguet 14 was typically assigned to serve in both reconnaissance and bombing roles.

A Bréguet 14 played a role in one of the last actions of the war. During November 1918, one aircraft was used to transport a German military officer, Major von Geyer, from Tergnier and Spa. It was covered in large white flags of truce to avoid being attacked.

The type continued to be widely used after the war, equipping the French occupation forces in Germany and being deployed to support French troops in the colonies. A special version was developed for the harsh conditions encountered overseas, designated "14 TOE" (Théatres des Operations Extérieures). These saw service in putting down uprisings in Syria and Morocco, in Vietnam and in the French intervention in the Russian Civil War. The last trainer examples were not withdrawn from French military service until 1932.

Other air arms using the type included Brazil (30), China (70), Czechoslovakia (10), Denmark (4), Finland (38), Greece (approximately 42), Japan (2), the Siamese Air Force (42), Uruguay (9) and Spain (approximately 180). The Polish Air Force used 158 Bréguet 14s, about 70 of them being used in combat in the Polish-Soviet war. In Japan, Bréguet 14s were licence-built by Nakajima. The type was also heavily used in various internal wars in China during the 1920s and 1930s.

Weeks after the signing of the Armistice, the Bréguet 14 was used to conduct several long-distance flights to demonstrate its capabilities. On 26 January 1919, a double-crossing of the Mediterranean was flown using the type by Lt Roget and Captaine Coli. On 5 April, Roget flew from Lyon to Rome and then to Nice. Aviation pioneer Pierre-Georges Latécoère converted one example to conduct experimental in-flight refuelling operations.
After the war, Bréguet manufactured of dedicated civil versions of the Bréguet 14. The 14 T.2 Salon carried two passengers in a specially modified fuselage. An improved version, the 14 Tbis, was built as both a land-plane and seaplane. The 14 Tbis also formed the basis of the improved 14 Tbis Sanitaire air ambulance version, and 100 mail planes custom-built for Latécoère's airline, Lignes Aeriennes Latécoère. After changing its name to "CGEA", the airline used, among others, 106 Bréguet 14s for flights over the Sahara Desert. The 18 T was a single 14 T re-engined with a Renault 12Ja engine and equipped to carry four passengers. When production finally ceased in 1928, the total for all versions built had exceeded 7,800 (according to other sources, 8,000 or even 8,370).

Variants

Data from:
Bréguet AV 1(Given the STAé designation Bréguet 13) Company designation of the first aircraft of the Bréguet 13/14 family. Powered by a  Renault V-12 engine with short fuselage and all-flying rudder.
Bréguet AV 2(Given the STAé designation Bréguet 14) Company designation of the second aircraft of the Bréguet 13 / 14 family. Powered by a  Renault V-12 engine in a longer fuselage with fixed fin.
Bréguet 13 AV 1 the first of the Bréguet 14 family with a short fuselage and no fixed fin.
Bréguet 14 A.2Basic production variant to the two-seat Army co-operation specification (A.2), powered by a  Renault 12Fcx V-12 engine.
Bréguet 14 AP.2High-altitude, long-range reconnaissance variant, powered by a  Liberty L-12 engine. One converted from an A.2
Bréguet 14 AEA single aircraft, (F-AEEZ), converted for use in the colonies.
Bréguet 14/400 Postwar aircraft powered by  Lorraine-Dietrich 12Da V-12 engines. Seventy aircraft delivered to China and Manchuria.
Bréguet 14 C A single aircraft powered by a  Renault 12Ja V-12 engine for use as a postal aircraft in the United States.
Bréguet 14 H A floatplane version powered by a  Renault 12Fe, with a large central float and smaller floats under each wing. At least two were built, used in Indo-China.
Bréguet 14 B.2 The two-seat bomber version.
Bréguet 14 B.1 A single-seat bomber version: two were ordered for a planned raid on Berlin.
Bréguet 14 floatplane A twin float hydroplane version, tested at St Raphaël in 1924.
Bréguet 14 S (S – Sanitaire) Ambulance aircraft modified to carry two stretchers in the rear fuselage. (A later dedicated ambulance aircraft was also produced).
Nakajima B-6 Bréguet 14 B.2 bombers licence-built in Japan by Nakajima, powered by  Rolls-Royce Eagle V-12 engines.
Yackey BRL-12 Transport American conversion of a 14 B.2 with corrugated fuselage skins and floats.

Operators

 Aeroposta Argentina
 Compañía Franco-Argentina de Transportes Aéreos SA

 Belgian Air Force operated by the 2nd, 3rd, 5th escadrilles until the mid-1920s.
 SNETA

 Brazilian Air Force operated 14 from 1919 until 1927.

 Nationalist Chinese Air Force operated 50 until 1932.

 Czechoslovak Air Force obtained 10 Breguet 14s in 1919.

 Danish Air Force operated several from 1920 until 1927.

 Air Force of El Salvador a single example was bought from France in the mid-1920s, but crashed in 1927 while delivering smallpox vaccine.

 Estonian Air Force operated one aircraft only.

 Finnish Air Force received 22 between 1919 and 1921 and operated them until 1927.

 Armée de l'Air
 French Navy used the Breguet 14 for reconnaissance from 1922, with the type remaining in service until 1930.

 Royal Hellenic Air Force Beginning in November 1917, Breguet 14s equipped the 532 Bombing and reconnaissance squadron and from June 1918, the 533 Fighter squadron. The Breguet 14 served in the 1919-1924 Greco-Turkish war but was replaced by Breguet 19s in 1925. 

 Guatemalan Air Force Three delivered, but returned unused after the instructor who accompanied them died.

 Imperial Japanese Army Air Force One 14 B.2 was purchased and a second one was built locally by Nakajima as the B-6.
Central Lithuania
 Army of Central Lithuania received two ex-Polish aircraft in 1920.
 Persia
 Iranian Air Force received two aircraft in 1924.

 Paraguayan Air Arm – one aircraft used in the Revolution of 1922

 Polish Air Force - three French escadrilles were redesignated as Polish and transferred with their aircraft to Poland in 1919. These were supplemented with an additional 70 aircraft which were eventually retired in 1924.

 Portuguese Air Force operated 28 14 A.2s and a single 14 T from 1919 until 1931.

 Royal Romanian Air Force operated 20 14 B.2s until replaced in the mid-1920s

 Serbian Air Force - During WW1 three French escadrilles operated in Serbia with Serbian crews, and their aircraft eventually transferred to Serbia - who used them until 1923 

 Soviet Air Force
 Spain
 Spanish Air Force

 Swedish Air Force - received one aircraft only in 1919, which was given a civil registration in 1923.
 SiamRoyal Siamese Air Force 40+ unit Siam can go up on its own

 Turkish Air Force

 United States Army Air Service
 96th Aero Squadron

 Uruguayan Air Force

 Yugoslav Royal Air Force may have operated one ex-Serbian example.

Survivors and replicas

Bre.2016 - Breguet 14 A.2 is on display at the Musée de l'air et de l'espace in Paris, France in French markings.
3C30 - The last survivor of 22 (or 30) examples bought shortly after the end of WW1, this Breguet 14 A.2 arrived in 1921, and was operational from 1922 until retired in 1927. It was on display following an extensive restoration at the Finnish Air Force Museum in Jyväskylä, Finland to its original Finnish markings.
A replica Breguet 14 built in 1980 as F-AZBP, and which appeared in several movies has been on display at the Royal Thai Air Force Museum in Bangkok since 2012 in Siamese markings as B.TH1.
A replica registered as F-AZBH is regularly flown on the French Airshow circuit, currently marked as an early aircraft, without camouflage, while it was previously marked as a Latécoère machine.
A replica marked as Bre.2812 and carrying the markings of the US Air Service's 96th Aero Squadron is on display at the Omaka Aviation Heritage Centre in New Zealand.

Specifications (14 B.2)

See also

References

Citations

Bibliography

 

1910s French bomber aircraft
1910s French military reconnaissance aircraft
Military aircraft of World War I
0014
Single-engined tractor aircraft
Biplanes with negative stagger
Aircraft first flown in 1916